Maria Maddalena Baldacci (1718–1782) was an Italian painter. She was born in Florence. She painted portrait miniatures and crayon, including the portrait of Empress Maria Theresa.

References

 

1718 births
1782 deaths
18th-century Italian painters
Italian Baroque painters
Italian women painters
Portrait miniaturists
18th-century Italian women artists